Arp Independent School District is a public school district based in Arp, Texas (USA).

Finances
As of the 2010-2011 school year, the appraised valuation of property in the district was $369,413,000. The maintenance tax rate was $0.104 and the bond tax rate was $0.023 per $100 of appraised valuation.

Academic achievement
In 2011, the school district was rated "recognized" by the Texas Education Agency. Forty-nine percent of districts in Texas in 2011 received the same rating. A school district in Texas can receive one of four possible rankings from the Texas Education Agency: Exemplary (the highest possible ranking), Recognized, Academically Acceptable, and Academically Unacceptable (the lowest possible ranking).

Historical district TEA accountability ratings
2011: Recognized
2010: Academically Acceptable
2009: Academically Acceptable
2008: Academically Acceptable
2007: Academically Unacceptable
2006: Academically Acceptable
2005: Academically Acceptable
2004: Academically Acceptable

Schools
In the 2011-2012 school year, the district had students in four schools.
Regular instructional
Arp High School (Grades 9-12)
Arp Junior High (Grades 6-8)
Arp Elementary School (Headstart & Grades PK-5)
JJAEP instructional
Smith County JJAEP (Grades 6-12)

Special programs

Athletics
Arp High School participates in the boys sports of baseball, basketball, football, and wrestling. The school participates in the girls sports of basketball, softball, and volleyball. For the 2012 through 2014 school years, Arp High School will play football in UIL Class 2A Division II.

Notable people 
The late Everett Doerge, a Louisiana state representative from Webster Parish from 1992 to 1998, began his teaching career in Arp about 1960. So did his wife and legislative successor, Jean M. Doerge of Minden, Louisiana.

See also

List of school districts in Texas
List of high schools in Texas

References

External links

School districts in Smith County, Texas
School districts established in 1905